The Storming of Kristianopel occurred on 26 June 1611, during the Kalmar War. Gustavus Adolphus of Sweden led an assault from the camp in Högsby in Småland on Kristianopel in Blekinge. The Swedes managed to siege the fortified city and went in by bombing the fortress port, which was badly defended. Right after the assault, there was a massacre of the city's population, with rape and pillaging.

Bibliography 
 Gustav Adolf II och Skåneland (in Swedish)
 Ulf Sundberg Svenska Krig 1521-1814 1998  (in Swedish)
 Göte Göransson Gustav II Adolf och hans folk 1994  (in Swedish)

1611 in Denmark
Kristianopel
Kristianopel
Kristianopel
Gustavus Adolphus of Sweden
Conflicts in 1611